Gentlea vatteri is a species of plant in the family Primulaceae. It is found in El Salvador and Guatemala. It is threatened by habitat loss.

References

vatteri
Data deficient plants
Taxonomy articles created by Polbot
Taxobox binomials not recognized by IUCN